Sofia Magdalena Mattsson (born 11 November 1989) is a Swedish wrestler, who has won a World Championship, four European championships and an Olympic bronze medal.

Profile 

Born in Gällivare, she is one of the highest-ranking female wrestlers in Europe. She wrestles in the 48 kilo division for the Gällivare SK Wrestling club, coached by Håkan Johansson and Kalle Taivalsaari. Since 2001, she has won eleven Swedish National Championships (six at cadet level, two at junior level and three at senior level).

In 2007 she competed at the European Championship in Sofia, her first ever international championship at senior level. Despite her young age and inexperience, she won her first match; however, in the following match she was defeated by the Russian wrestler Larisa Oorzhak (who went on to win the gold medal).  In the repechage, Mattsson defeated her other two opponents and won the bronze medal.

In August 2007, Mattsson became Junior World Champion for the second time after she defeated the Japanese wrestler Fuyuko Mimura in Beijing.

In September the same year, she competed at her first ever World Championship at senior level in Baku, Azerbaijan, where she placed 8th, assuring herself qualification for the 2008 Summer Olympics.

In April 2008 the young Swedish wrestler won a silver medal at her second ever European Championship at senior level.  That summer, she was defeated in the second round at the Olympics by Clarissa Chun.

In September 2009, Mattsson won the Senior World Championship in 51 kg.

At the 2012 Summer Olympics, Mattsson competed in the women's lightweight (-55 kg) division.  She beat Sündeviin Byambatseren in the first round and Marwa Amri in the second, but lost to Valeria Zholobova in the quarterfinals.

In 2014, Mattsson competed on the Swedish version of the television show Fort Boyard.

In June 2015, she competed in the inaugural European Games, for Sweden in wrestling, more specifically, the women's freestyle 55 kg division. She earned a gold medal.

On 9 March 2016 Mattsson won the 2016 European Wrestling Championships, she won all wrestling matches by fall.  She won the bronze medal in 53 kg (featherweight) at the 2016 Olympic Games in Rio de Janeiro.  She did this by beating Odunayo Adekuoroye in the last 16, then Katarzyna Krawczyk in the quarterfinals.  She lost to eventual gold medalist Helen Maroulis in the semifinals.  Mattsson was entered into the repechage, where she beat Zhong Xuechun to win a bronze medal.

In March 2021, she qualified at the European Qualification Tournament to compete at the 2020 Summer Olympics in Tokyo, Japan. She competed in the women's 53 kg event.

She is in the team of Haryana Hammers pro wrestling season2 held in New Delhi.

National results 

2008 – 1st at the Swedish National Championship
2007 – 1st at the Junior Swedish National Championship
2007 – 1st at the Swedish National Championship
2006 – 1st at the Swedish National Championship
2006 – 1st at the Junior Swedish National Championship
2006 – 1st at the Cadet Swedish National Championship
2005 – 1st at the Cadet Swedish National Championship
2004 – 1st at the Cadet Swedish National Championship
2003 – 1st at the Cadet Swedish National Championship
2002 – 1st at the Cadet Swedish National Championship
2001 – 1st at the Cadet Swedish National Championship

International results

Senior

Junior and cadet 
2007 – 1st at the Junior World Championship in Beijing, China
2006 – 1st at the Junior World Championship in Guatemala
2006 – 1st at the Cadet European Championship in Turkey
2005 – 1st at the Cadet European Championship in Albania
2004 – 1st at the Cadet European Championship in Bulgaria

Trivia 
At the European Championship in Sofia, the organisers of the event awarded her with the title "Miss Europe", a prize reserved for the prettiest wrestler at the tournament. However, she refused to accept the prize and commented: "This is not part of the sport. We are here to excel and win at wrestling. There are some people who compete in that other thing too but we don't do that here".

References

External links 
 Gällivare SK Wrestling Profile
 Profile at FILA Wrestling Database
 

1989 births
Living people
People from Gällivare Municipality
Swedish female sport wrestlers
Wrestlers at the 2008 Summer Olympics
Wrestlers at the 2012 Summer Olympics
Wrestlers at the 2016 Summer Olympics
Olympic wrestlers of Sweden
European Games gold medalists for Sweden
European Games medalists in wrestling
Wrestlers at the 2015 European Games
World Wrestling Championships medalists
Olympic bronze medalists for Sweden
Olympic medalists in wrestling
Medalists at the 2016 Summer Olympics
Wrestlers at the 2019 European Games
European Wrestling Championships medalists
Wrestlers at the 2020 Summer Olympics
Sportspeople from Norrbotten County
20th-century Swedish women
21st-century Swedish women